The Legend of Jesse James is a 1980 country music concept album written by English songwriter Paul Kennerley, based on the story of American Old West outlaw Jesse James.

The album features Levon Helm singing the role of Jesse James, Johnny Cash as Frank James, Charlie Daniels as Cole Younger and Emmylou Harris as Jesse James' wife, Zerelda James. Other singers featured included Rosanne Cash, Rodney Crowell and Albert Lee.

The album was re-released in 1999 in a two-for-one package with Kennerley's 1978 concept album, White Mansions, about the Confederate States of America.

The album art was painted by noted comic book artist Howard Chaykin.

Track listing

Personnel

Cast
 Johnny Cash as Frank James (vocals)
 Rosanne Cash as Ma Samuel (vocals)
 Donivan Cowart as Robert Ford (vocals)
 Martin Cowart as Charley Ford (vocals)
 Rodney Crowell as The Officer (vocals)
 Charlie Daniels as Cole Younger (vocals, fiddle, slide guitar)
 Emmylou Harris as Zerelda James (vocals, acoustic guitar)
 Levon Helm as Jesse James (vocals, drums, harmonica)
 Paul Kennerley as James Timberlake (vocals, guitars)
 Albert Lee as Jim Younger (vocals, guitars, mandolin)
 Jody Payne as Doc Samuel (vocals)

backing musicians and production
 Jesse Ed Davis – slide guitar, electric guitar
 Nick De Caro – accordion, arrangements
 Sean Fullan – engineer
 Emory Gordy – bass guitar
 Tim Gorman – piano
 Glyn Johns – producer, engineer
 Bernie Leadon – banjo, acoustic guitar
 Doug Sax – engineer

References

External links
 The Legend of Jesse James at The Band: History

1980 albums
Country albums by American artists
Collaborative albums
Concept albums
Albums produced by Glyn Johns
A&M Records albums
Songs about Jesse James
Cultural depictions of Jesse James

it:La leggenda di Jesse James